Richard Gallien is an American college tennis coach and former professional player.

Raised in Sunland, Los Angeles, Gallien won a City section singles title while a senior at Verdugo Hills High School.

Gallien played collegiate tennis for Pepperdine University, where he twice earned All-American honors. He was a member of the team which finished as runners-up in the 1982 NCAA championships. In 1983 represented the U.S. at the World University Games and won the singles final against Dan Goldie to become the first American tennis singles gold medalist in games history (along with Cecilia Fernandez who won the women's event).

Competing briefly in professional tennis, Gallien had a best singles world ranking of 433. He featured in the main draw of the 1983 Pacific Southwest Open and had a win over Ben Testerman, before falling to world number six Gene Mayer.

Gallien was head coach of the USC Trojans women's team for 22-years, from 1995 to 2017, during which time he was named Pac-12 Coach of the Year on five occasions. He is a former men's co-head coach of Pepperdine (with Allen Fox from 1988 to 1990) and is now the women's head coach of Cal State LA.

References

External links
 
 

Year of birth missing (living people)
Living people
American male tennis players
Pepperdine Waves men's tennis players
Pepperdine Waves men's tennis coaches
USC Trojans women's tennis coaches
California State University, Los Angeles faculty
American tennis coaches
Medalists at the 1983 Summer Universiade
Universiade gold medalists for the United States
Universiade medalists in tennis
Tennis players from Los Angeles